The 1930 Kentucky Derby was the 56th running of the Kentucky Derby. The race took place on May 17, 1930. Horse Busy scratched before the race.

Full results

 Winning Breeder: Belair Stud; (MD)

Payout

 The winner received a purse of $50,725 and a $5000 Gold Cup.
 Second place received $6,000.
 Third place received $3,000.
 Fourth place received $1,000.

References

1930
Kentucky Derby
Derby
May 1930 sports events